A substantial meal or table meal is a legal term of art regarding the application of alcohol licensing laws in England and Wales. It was also used in reference to the closure in England of pubs, restaurants and cafés due to the COVID-19 pandemic, with those serving "substantial meals" being protected.

In Ireland, on 29 June 2020, all restaurants and cafés reopened providing on-premises food and drink where they can comply with social distancing measures and strict cleaning in operation. All bars and pubs reopened serving table service only, and customers must buy a "substantial" meal worth at least €9.

History
In Soloman v Green (1955), the High Court held that sandwiches and sausages on sticks amounted to a meal under English and Welsh law. The Licensing Act 1964 defined "table service" as "a meal eaten by a person seated at a table, or at a counter or other structure that serves the purpose of a table and is not used for the service of refreshments for consumption by persons not seated at a table or structure serving the purpose of a table".

In Timmis v Millman (1965), where Millman and Yarnold had been consuming light ale and stout outside of permitted hours (but within the supper hour extension of the time), the High Court found the sandwiches the pair were eating constituted a "table meal" as they "were so substantial, and assisted by the pickles and beetroot so as to justify that it was a table meal and not a mere snack from the bar". The Licensing Act 2003 contains a clause which permits 16- or 17-year-olds to consume beer, wine or cider with a table meal if they are accompanied by an adult.

The terms "table meals", "substantial meals", "plated meals" and "substantial food" are considered analogous terms in a sample of 319 "statements of licensing policy" issued by local authorities (a document which details how they approach licensing applications in their area). Of the sampled documents, 95 made reference to one of these terms and a further 13 to alcohol being "ancillary to food" or a meal.

COVID tier restrictions in England
The cases of Soloman v Green and Timmis v Millman were first cited by legal experts in the run-up to the first COVID-19 tier regulations in England, where pubs and restaurants in tier 3 areas were only allowed by Cabinet policymakers to serve alcoholic drinks with a substantial meal.

During the more restrictive all-tier regulations issued in December 2020 (wherein the majority of England was in tier 2 regulations) the government's COVID-19 Winter Plan advised: "In tier 2, pubs and bars must close unless they are serving substantial meals (like a full breakfast, main lunchtime or evening meal), along with accompanying drinks." Schedule Two, Reg.14(2) and Reg 14(4) of the regulations included similar prohibitions on pubs and restaurants as the previous tier 3 restrictions, which has a significant impact on pubs that are led by alcohol sales ('wet-led' pubs). Summarising the effect of the regulations, Health Secretary Matt Hancock told Parliament that "pubs and bars must close unless operating as restaurants".

The terms have been criticised as subjective, and their application has been seen as being affected by snobbery. Research has long shown that questions of "class and calibre" form part of the interpretation and enforcement of licensing conditions. For example, "high-end crisps" served in "substantial portions accompanied with various elaborate dips" were considered a substantial meal in a 2017 Westminster City Council hearing, with the council congratulating the owner on "[creating] a 'non-Walkers' crisp offer and the desire to celebrate the great British potato at its peak and most hip".

After the introduction of the three-tier system following the second English COVID-19 lockdown, there was substantial press interest in the definition of a 'substantial meal'. In Manchester, 22-inch slices of pizza were considered substantial after police initially shut down one bar for serving them alongside alcohol under (then) tier 3 regulations. Serious newspapers published articles in their nutrition section on whether scotch eggs constituted a substantial meal. On 30 November, Environment and Food Secretary George Eustice claimed that they "probably would count". Although ministers have no legal authority to define a 'substantial meal', definitions offered by various politicians included:
 one "you would expect to have as a midday meal or an evening meal", disregarding snacks such as crisps and chips; not a Cornish pasty on its own, as Communities Secretary Robert Jenrick overruled Food Secretary Eustice, and the PM's spokesman insisted "bar snacks do not count". 
 Scotch eggs could not serve as substantial meals, according to Cabinet Office Minister Michael Gove while Health Secretary Matt Hancock said: "A scotch egg that is served as a substantial meal, that is a substantial meal."

The Scotch egg fight ended in a victory for Sacha Lord and his associates on 1 March 2021, when Mr Justice Richard Pearce found that the policy was discriminatory towards sections of society in disadvantaged areas who rely on wet-led pubs for community socialisation and cannot afford meals out. Lord was supported by UKHospitality, the British Beer and Pub Association, the Night Time Industries Association, several national breweries and some local businesses. His solicitor on the case was Oliver Wright.

References 

Alcohol law in the United Kingdom
COVID-19 pandemic in the United Kingdom
2020 in the United Kingdom
2021 in the United Kingdom